Radio Nationale may refer to:

 Radio Nationale (France): a collaborationist radio station active in Vichy France between 1940 and 1944.
 Radio Nationale (Mauritania): the national radio of Mauritania.